This article lists diplomatic missions resident in Moldova. At present, the capital city of Chişinău hosts 28 embassies. Many other countries are represented through their embassies in other regional capitals such as Bucharest, Budapest, Kyiv, or Moscow.

Embassies 
Chişinău

Missions/Offices 
 (Embassy office)
 (Delegation)
 (Liaison office)

Gallery

Consulates-General/Consulates 
Bălţi
 (Consulate-General)
 (Consulate)

Cahul
 (Consulate-General)

Comrat 
 (Consulate-General)

Accredited embassies 
Resident in Bucharest, Romania

  

Resident in Kyiv, Ukraine

Resident in Moscow, Russia

 

 

 

 

 

Resident in Budapest, Hungary

 

Resident in Sofia, Bulgaria

 
 

Other locations

 (Warsaw)
 (Warsaw)
 (Geneva)
 (Valletta)
 (Athens)
 (Brussels)
 (Vienna)

See also 

 List of diplomatic missions of Moldova
 Foreign relations of Moldova
 Visa requirements for Moldovan citizens

References

External links 
 Diplomatic Missions in the Republic of Moldova

 
Moldova
Diplomatic missions